Johanna Fällman (born 21 June 1990) is a Swedish ice hockey defender, currently playing for Luleå HF/MSSK in the Swedish Women's Hockey League  (SDHL) and the Swedish national team. She has won four SDHL championships and has appeared in seven IIHF World Championships and one Olympic tournament for Sweden.

Career 
Growing up in Luleå, in northern Sweden, Fällman often played on boys' teams in her youth. She has spoken out openly about having faced misogynistic abuse from boys she played with in the league.

She began her Riksserien career with Skellefteå AIK, scoring 2 points in 12 games in the league's debut season. From 2008 to 2012, she played for Modo Hockey, winning the Riksserien championship in the 2011–12 season.

Ahead of the 2012–13 season, she turned down an offer from Munksund-Skuthamns SK to move to North America, joining the University of North Dakota. Across three years in the NCAA, she scored 8 points in 66 games.

In 2015, she returned to Sweden to sign with Luleå HF/MSSK in her hometown, being named an assistant captain for the club ahead of the 2015–16 season. She scored 16 points in 33 games that year, as Luleå won the SDHL championship for the first time.

In January 2019, she picked up a Gordie Howe hat-trick in a 14–0 victory over Göteborg HC, a rare event in women's hockey, after getting into a fight with Anna Borgfeldt.

International career 
Fällman made her senior Swedish national team debut in 2008, at the age of 18.

She made her IIHF World Championship debut at the 2011 IIHF Women's World Championship, not scoring a point in the five games she played. She has since participated at every World Championship for Sweden, including the 2017 IIHF Women's World Championship, where she scored four goals, and the 2019 IIHF Women's World Championship when Sweden was relegated for the first time in the country's history.

She played for Sweden at the 2018 Winter Olympics, scoring one goal in six games as the country finished in seventh.

She welcomed the unionization of the Swedish national team in 2018, stating that "we will be able to create better conditions both on and off the ice." She was among the players who participated in the 2019 Sweden women's national ice hockey team strike.

Style of play 
Fällman is known for playing a rougher, more physical style and her defensive positioning.

References

External links

1990 births
Living people
Swedish women's ice hockey defencemen
North Dakota Fighting Hawks women's ice hockey players
Swedish expatriate ice hockey players in the United States
People from Luleå
Olympic ice hockey players of Sweden
Ice hockey players at the 2018 Winter Olympics
Ice hockey players at the 2022 Winter Olympics
Luleå HF/MSSK players
Sportspeople from Norrbotten County